Edward Alfred Spearritt (born 31 January 1947) is an English retired footballer who played as a midfielder. He played for Ipswich Town, Brighton & Hove Albion, Carlisle United and Gillingham. He spent some seasons in the then-top level of the English football league system while with Ipswich and Carlisle. He won Brighton & Hove Albion player of the year.

He is the uncle of Hannah Spearritt, a member of S Club 7.

References

External links
Eddie Spearritt profile at Ipswich Town Talk 

1947 births
Living people
People from Lowestoft
Footballers from Suffolk
English footballers
Association football midfielders
Ipswich Town F.C. players
Brighton & Hove Albion F.C. players
Carlisle United F.C. players
Gillingham F.C. players
Brisbane Roar FC players
English Football League players
National Soccer League (Australia) players